The Government of Ireland Bill may refer to 
Government of Ireland Bill 1886 
Government of Ireland Bill 1893 
Government of Ireland Bill 1914
Government of Ireland Bill 1920